Villeroy & Boch is a German manufacturer of ceramics, with the company headquarters located in Mettlach, Saarland.

History 
The company began in the tiny Lorraine village of Audun le Tiche, where the iron master François Boch set up a pottery company with his three sons in 1748. In 1766 Boch was licensed to build a ceramics kilnworks nearby at Septfontaines, Luxembourg, where it operated a porcelain factory. In 1785 Nicolas Villeroy became sole owner of the faience manufactory at Wallerfangen. In 1812 Jean-François Boch began construction of kilns at the nearby town of Mettlach, Saarland. In 1824 Boch commenced transfer printing on porcelain from engraved copper plates. On 14 April 1836, the Jean François Boch company merged with that of the competitor, Nicolas Villeroy, and became Villeroy & Boch, (V&B, also simply 'VB'). In 1869, Villeroy & Boch opened the first manufactory specializing in architectural tiles.

The company is today operating in two divisions: Tableware, and Bathroom and Wellness. The Tiles division became a separate company (V&B Fliesen GmbH) in 2006. In 2007 the Villeroy & Boch AG sold 51% of the V&B Fliesen GmbH to the (Eczacıbaşı Holding). Today there is only a 2.29% holding in the share capital of V&B Fliesen GmbH.

Among its innovations in Mettlach at the end of the nineteenth century was Phanolith, a kind of semi-transparent porcelain that combines the characteristics and benefits of jasperware and pâte-sur-pâte. The creator of the Phanolith was the ceramics artist Jean-Baptiste Stahl, who headed the modelling section of Villeroy & Boch. Phanolith gained first wide public attention at the Paris Exposition Universelle (1900).

Villeroy & Boch has continued to base its broadest market in Germany.

Technology 
TitanCeram is a special compound of clay, quartz, feldspar and titanium dioxide which, in combination with special production steps, makes it possible to create exceptionally precise shapes without sacrificing durability.

DirectFlush is a rimless design of toilet, specifically created to make it easier to clean. 

Quaryl® is a composite material which provides the properties of a natural quartz and combined using an acrylic resin. 

CeramicPlus® is a special glaze developed by Villeroy & Boch to improve the durability and hygiene of their ceramic products by making it scratch-resistant and easier to clean since droplets will have a harder time sticking into the surface.

Current situation 
The company's Luxembourg factory was closed down in 2010. While the company is no longer run by a family member, under the present Group Chairman Frank Goering, there are various family members currently working in the company. Since 1990 the company has been listed on the German stock market, ticker symbol VIB3, but the voting capital is still in the hands of the family descendants.

The Villeroy & Boch Group increased its consolidated revenue by 2% to €853.1 million in the 2018 financial year. The Bathroom and Wellness Division increased its revenue by 4.7% to €584.3 million. The Tableware Division generated a revenue volume of €266.2 million, down 4.4% on the previous year.

Gallery

Footnotes

External links 

Company homepage Villeroy-Boch.com
Chateau de Septfontaines ... origin of VB factories
Museum of Ceramics by Villeroy & Boch
 Anna Boch.com, impressionist painter, famous Art Collector - Boch family 4th generation
 Eugene Boch.com, impressionist painter, friend of Vincent van Gogh - Boch family 4th generation
A history of the Villeroy - Boch porcelain markings
Mettlach Exhibition at the American Museum of Ceramic Art
 

1748 establishments in Europe
Companies established in 1748
Ceramics manufacturers of Germany
Companies based in Saarland
German brands
German porcelain
Merzig-Wadern